Jean Baptiste Henri Joseph Desmazières (10 July 1786 in Lille – 23 June 1862 in Lambersart) was a merchant of Lille and an amateur mycologist. He was the editor of the scientific journals "Annales des sciences naturelles" and the "Bulletin de la société des sciences de Lille".

He was creator of the exsiccatae series "Plantes cryptogames du Nord de la France" (1825–1851)  and "Plantes cryptogames de France" (1853–1861). In 1827 he published a treatise on the genus Mycoderma, titled "Recherches microscopiques et physiologiques sur le genre Mycoderma".

He was the binomial author of the fungi species Agaricus radians  and Aspergillus clavatus.

Eponymous taxa
Desmazierella , genus of fungi in the family Sarcoscyphaceae, 
Desmazieria (now Ramalinaand Niebla, genera of lichen)
Neoascochyta desmazieri , species of fungi, (syn. Ascochyta desmazieri)
Cainia desmazieri 
Meloderma desmazieri

See also
 :Category:Taxa named by John Baptiste Henri Joseph Desmazières

References

External links 
works by John Baptiste Henri Joseph Desmazières

1786 births
1862 deaths
French mycologists
People from Lille